Mar de amor (English: Curse By The Sea) is a Spanish-language Mexican telenovela produced by Nathalie Lartilleux for Televisa in 2009. This is a remake of the 1978 Venezuelan telenovela María del Mar.

On Monday, November 16, 2009, Canal de las Estrellas started broadcasting Mar de amor weekdays at 7:00pm, replacing Mi pecado. The last episode was broadcast on Friday, July 2, 2010 with Cuando me enamoro replacing it the following day.

Zuria Vega and Mario Cimarro starred as protagonists, while Ninel Conde, Mariana Seoane and Manuel Landeta starred as antagonists. With stellar performances of the leading actors Juan Ferrara, Norma Herrera, Erika Buenfil, Raquel Olmedo, Sergio Reynoso, Ignacio Lopez Tarso and María Sorté.

Plot
For Estrella (Zuria Vega), life is like the sea: full of danger and evil, but also has the ability to fight and move forward. Far from her foster father, this humble fisher has suffered from the disorder that Crazy Casilda (Erika Buenfil) has. Casilda is Estrella's mother, who was in this state after being raped by Guillermo (Juan Ferrara), a wealthy man who is tormented by this sin. Since then, the crazy Casilda roams places aimlessly; however, in the absence of her parents, Estrella received shelter from her humble sponsors who have brought her up as their child. In her fondness for study, Estrella learned to read, and through books, knew what love is. Consequently, she begins to fall for the famous writer, Victor Manuel Galindez (Mario Cimarro).

Victor Manuel has spent years traveling all over the world while writing his many adventures as a sailor, but one day, destiny and fate crosses his path and he meets Coral (Ninel Conde), a woman who washed up on a beach and has amnesia. This strange woman steals Victor Manuel's heart, but their relationship ends when Victor Manuel learns that Coral was killed in a tragic boat explosion. Devastated and feeling guilty about the death of Coral, Victor Manuel returns to Playa Escondida, the town where he grew up. He never imagines that Estrella might bring the sparkle back to his life.

After drinking, he flies a plane to Playa Escondida and falls asleep, almost crashing the plane into Estrella, while at fishing. Estrella recognizes the author who made her love reading. Very excited, she decides to help the sailor, who at first does not accept Estrella into his heart, but with the tenderness of a humble fisherman, Victor Manuel is overcome with passion for her.

Problems begin to arise for Estrella as a wealthy but selfish man, León Parra-Ibáñez (Manuel Landeta), wants to build a hotel complex on her sunny village. To carry out his plans, he wants to have the town cleared. All the fishermen who live in Playa Escondida would have to leave. Unfortunately, this land belongs to Victor Manuel. León wants to buy the land that belongs to Victor Manuel; therefore, he convinces his self-centered daughter, Oriana (Mariana Seoane), into seducing Victor Manuel in order to convince him to sell the land.

Casilda returns to Playa Escondida full of anger and revenge toward those who hurt her. She attempts suicide by almost drowning herself, but some villagers rescue her. Now, Estrella needs to work to cure her mother of these suicide thoughts. She wants to pay for therapy so she goes to the house of León and begins to work as his secretary. León is struck with her beauty and wants her and this only makes Oriana hate Estrella more. León's relative, Guillermo, visits from time to time; he learns that Estrella is the daughter he abandoned years ago. Drowned in a deep depression, he admits to Estrella that is he who caused so much damage to Casilda, and therefore, her father.

León is very jealous of Victor Manuel and wants Estrella for himself, so he pretends to be sleeping with a girl who looks like Estrella, while Victor Manuel watches. Thinking it's Estrella, Victor Manuel, in revenge, becomes entangled with Oriana before Estrella's eyes. Hurt and heartbroken by what she has seen, Estrella takes Casilda to Mexico City to cure her condition. She avoids Victor Manuel and her father, who she still has a grudge against, for leaving them.

Once in Mexico City, Estrella meets the psychiatrist Dr. Hernán Irazábal (Marcelo Córdoba), who falls in love with her. Victor Manuel learns that it was all a trap from León and decides to search for Estrella, but soon, he encounters the woman that he fell in love in the past—Coral. She was found alive on the shore in Playa Escondida, without any memory. She doesn't even recognize Victor Manuel. He feels guilty about her situation and decides to help by letting her stay in his mansion. In reality, Coral just wants to stay at his side to conquer and enjoy his wealth.

Meanwhile, Hernán helps Casilda heal while becoming good friends with Estrella, who begins to feel affection for him. Time passes and Hernán helps Estrella become a successful woman. Guillermo gives Estrella his inheritance, frustrating León and Oriana. Her mother Casilda is cured of her disorder and Hernán begins to date Estrella and helps her overcome her disappointment in Victor Manuel. Estrella is now working a big business and is very happy; however, the past comes back to haunt her.

Elsewhere, Victor Manuel cannot stop looking at Estrella and, to his dismay, Coral gets a tumor and will die in a few months. Hernán finds out about this and thinks he might lose Estrella if the two meet again. He tries to prevent them reuniting, but inevitably, their paths cross again. Estrella has changed and Victor Manuel is strapped to a deranged Coral. She has befriended León throughout their mutual hate for Victor Manuel and Estrella. They are full of vengeance and ready to finish them off. Throughout these months, Oriana begins to change. She sees that she was wrong to be so selfish and evil and has a change of heart. She begins to love Santos, a nice man that has always loved her. Thereafter, they make love and after a while, get married.

Victor Manuel begins to see Estrella again. One night, he gets in a fight with Hernán. After Hernán is found dead, Victor Manuel is the main suspect and is put in jail when in reality, Hernán was killed by his nurse. During Oriana and Santos' wedding, Estrella is shot by León which leads to her paralysis, but she begins to do physical therapy and heals. Soon, Victor Manuel is proven innocent and returns to be with Estrella. Once Victor Manuel is released from jail, there is nothing standing in the way of him and Estrella being together.

Victor Manuel takes Estrella to a romantic getaway where they make love. León tries to kill Victor Manuel by locking him in a lion's cage at a circus, but Coral appears and locks León inside the lion cage, too. Estrella finds them and helps Victor Manuel get out while León is killed by the lion. Coral has her arm and leg paralyzed because of the tumor so she commits suicide in the sea. In the end, only the true bond of love between Estrella and Victor Manuel prevailed. They seal their love with marriage and live happily ever after.

Cast

Main 
Zuria Vega as Estrella Marina Briceño de Galíndéz
Mario Cimarro as Víctor Manuel Galíndéz Garabán
Ninel Conde as Catalina "Coral" Mijares
Mariana Seoane as Oriana Parra-Ibáñez Briceño
Manuel Landeta as León Parra-Ibáñez
Erika Buenfil as Casilda de Briceño "La Loca Casilda"
Juan Ferrara as Guillermo Briceño
María Sorté as Aurora de Ruiz
Norma Herrera as Violeta
Raquel Olmedo as Luz Garabán
Ignacio López Tarso as El Mojarras
Sergio Reynoso as Antonio Ruiz

Supporting

Marcelo Córdoba as Dr. Hernán Irazabal
Arturo Carmona as Santos Nieves
Patsy as Lucía Galíndez
Amairani as Federica Martínez
 Tatiana as Isolda
Victoria Díaz as Dr. Mercedes Acala
Florencia del Saracho as Elena "Elenita" Parra-Ibáñez Briceño
Nicolás Mena as Jorge Parra-Ibáñez Garabán
Mar Contreras as Roselia
Yuliana Peniche as Reyna
Georgina Salgado as Esperanza Ruiz
Renata Notni as Carmen "Carmita" Bracho
Ramón Valdez Urtiz as Salvador "Chava" Ruiz
Juan Ángel Esparza as Dr. Oswaldo Ascanio
Elsa Cárdenas as Luciana de Irazabal
Arlette Pacheco as Maura Larroja
Elizabeth Dupeyrón as Mística
Claudia Ortega as Silvia
Claudia Silva as Inés Lombardo
Renata Flores as Simona
Beatriz Monroy as Crisanta
Gerardo Albarrán as Roberto Oduver/Ricardo Oduver
Javier Ruán as Bracho
Toño Infante as Tiburón
Ernesto Faxas as Gustavo
Rodrigo Nehme as Lorenzo Garabán
Mauricio Mejía as Lic. Marco Tulio Plaza
Marco Méndez as David Bermúdez
Adrián Martiñón as Martín
Amor Flores as Chom
Yirelka Yeraldine as Transito
Oscar Ferretti as Padre Zamorita
Aleyda Gallardo as Rita
Evelyn Zavala as Abril
Rosángela Balbó as Estefanía Peralta
Erick Fernando as Tilico
Queta Lavat as Alfonsina Zapata
Rafael del Villar as Enrique
Luis Bayardo as Judge Moncada
Juan Carlos Bonet as León's lawyer
Marius Biegai as Gerente Mía
Fernando Estrada as Dr. Ángel Sánchez
Jaime Lozano as Lic. Espinoza
Sebastián Dopazo as Lic. Prado
Hugo Macías Macotela as Judge
Juan Ignacio Aranda as Fiscal
Rafael Origel as Judge's Secretary
José Antonio Ferral as Public Ministry
Esteban Franco as Salvador's lawyer

Awards

Premios TVyNovelas

References

External links
 

2009 telenovelas
2009 Mexican television series debuts
2010 Mexican television series endings
Television shows set in Mexico
Mexican telenovelas
Televisa telenovelas
Mexican television series based on Venezuelan television series
Spanish-language telenovelas